Yeison Guerrero Perea (born 21 April 1998) is an Ecuadorian footballer.

Career statistics

Club

Notes

References

1998 births
Living people
Sportspeople from Esmeraldas, Ecuador
Ecuadorian footballers
Ecuadorian expatriate footballers
Ecuador under-20 international footballers
Association football forwards
Ecuadorian Serie A players
Liga MX players
C.S.D. Independiente del Valle footballers
C.D. Veracruz footballers
Delfín S.C. footballers
Ecuadorian expatriate sportspeople in Mexico
Expatriate footballers in Mexico
C.S. Norte América footballers